The 1944 Kentucky Wildcats football team represented the University of Kentucky in the 1944 college football season.

Schedule

References

Kentucky
Kentucky Wildcats football seasons
Kentucky Wildcats football